Adalberto Siebens (born 20 October 1946) is a Puerto Rican boxer. He competed in the men's light welterweight event at the 1968 Summer Olympics. At the 1968 Summer Olympics, he lost to Habib Galhia of Tunisia.

References

1946 births
Living people
Puerto Rican male boxers
Olympic boxers of Puerto Rico
Boxers at the 1968 Summer Olympics
People from Guayanilla, Puerto Rico
Light-welterweight boxers